Enyalioides rudolfarndti is a species of lizards in the genus Enyalioides known from Peru.

References

Reptiles described in 2011
Reptiles of Peru
Endemic fauna of Peru
Lizards of South America
Enyalioides
Taxa named by Pablo J. Venegas
Taxa named by Vilma Duran